Bailie Jaye Key (born 16 March 1999) is a retired American artistic gymnast. She was a member of the gold-medal-winning team at the 2014 Pacific Rim Championships and was the 2013 U.S. Junior National Champion.

Gymnastics career

2011-14: Junior international elite 

Key was born in Augusta, Georgia and trained at Texas Dreams Gymnastics under former gymnast and Olympic bronze medalist Kim Zmeskal and her husband, Chris Burdette. Her teammates included Peyton Ernst, Kennedy Baker and Veronica Hults.

In July 2011, Key competed at the 2011 U.S. CoverGirl Classic in Chicago, Illinois. She placed seventh in the overall standings. Later that year, she competed in the Visa National Championships. She came in ninth overall with a two-day combined score of 109.550.

Key competed at the 2012 City of Jesolo Trophy. She won a gold medal with the team. She scored 14.250 on the floor exercise, which was enough to give her a bronze medal, and she was third in the all-around. At the U.S. Classic, she scored a 56.600, placing fifth. A few weeks later, at the Visa Championships, Key finished fourth in the all-around but got a bronze medal on the balance beam and floor exercise.

In March 2013, Key went to the 2013 City of Jesolo Trophy. She won the all-around gold medal with 58.100 and another two golds and one bronze in the event finals. In July, she competed at the Secret U.S. Classic, where she won the all-around title with a score of 58.250. She scored a 14.000 on floor, 14.250 on uneven bars to finish in fifth, 15.000 on vault to place third, and 15.000 on beam to place second. In August, Key competed at the P&G National Championships, which took place over two days, with the combined scores determining final placings. Key won gold in the all-around, beam and floor and placed fourth on bars and vault. Her scores for Day 1 were 15.350 on beam, 13.950 on bars, 14.800 on floor and 15.100 on vault. Her Day 2 scores were 15.550 on beam, 14.100 on bars, 14.950 on floor and 14.750 on vault. Her total all-around score was 118.550.

Following her all-around win at the P&G Championships, Key was selected along with Laurie Hernandez, who placed second at the P&G Championships, to represent the United States at the Junior Japan International in Yokohama, Japan. Key won the all-around with a score of 58.400. She also won the vault, uneven bars, balance beam and floor exercise titles.

In November, Key was selected, along with fellow junior gymnasts Hernandez, Veronica Hults and Emily Gaskins and senior gymnasts Maggie Nichols and Peyton Ernst to represent the United States at the 2013 Mexican Open in Acapulco, Mexico. Key helped the American juniors take the team title in the International Junior Cup and also won the all-around title ahead of Hernandez, Gaskins and Hults, who finished second, third and fourth, respectively; however, only Key and Hernandez were awarded the gold and silver medals because of a two-per-country rule.

In 2014, Key competed at the City of Jesolo Trophy in Jesolo, Italy. The United States won the team competition, and she won the all-around and three events (vault, bars and floor) and placed second on beam. She was named to the American team for the Pacific Rim Championships in Richmond, Canada, in April 2014. There, she won the all-around, vault and floor medals for the junior division and placed second on uneven bars and balance beam.

Key withdrew from the 2014 Secret U.S. Classic because of a minor arm injury.

Later in the season, she withdrew from the 2014 P&G National Championships with the same nagging arm injury and was consequently unable to defend her national title.

On September 14, 2014, Key verbally committed to the Florida Gators women's gymnastics team. She announced the news through social media.

2015-2016: Senior career 
Key turned senior in 2015, consequently becoming age-eligible for a place on the USA Gymnastics team for the 2015 World Championships in Glasgow, Scotland, and for the 2016 Summer Olympics in Rio de Janeiro, Brazil.

City of Jesolo Trophy

In March 2015, Key competed at the 2015 City of Jesolo Trophy as part of the United States' senior team. She came in second place, behind Simone Biles, in the all-around with a score of 59.500, surpassing both Gabby Douglas and Aly Raisman. She scored 15.000 on floor, 14.900 on bars, 15.200 on vault and 14.400 on beam. She also placed 2nd in the uneven bars final, earning the silver medal and also earned a gold medal with the U.S team.

Secret U.S. Classic

On July 25, Key competed at the Secret U.S. Classic. She placed 4th in the all-around with a score of 59.450, behind 2-time World All-Around Champion Simone Biles, 2012 Olympic All-Around Champion Gabby Douglas, and Maggie Nichols and ahead of Aly Raisman. She placed 3rd on bars (15.300) behind Madison Kocian and Douglas, tied for 5th on beam with Nichols (14.450) behind Biles, Raisman, Douglas, and Kyla Ross, and tied for 3rd with Nichols on floor (14.800) behind Biles and Douglas.

P&G Championships

At the P&G Championships held in Indianapolis, Indiana on August 13 & 15, Key finished 4th in the all-around with a 2-night score of 118.350, placing behind Simone Biles, Maggie Nichols, and Aly Raisman.

On night one, Key scored a 15.200 on bars, a 13.700 on beam (after grabbing the beam and being overtime), a 14.450 on floor, and a 15.250 on vault for an all around score of 58.600, .050 behind Raisman. This placed her fourth after night one.

On the second day of competition, Key scored a 14.550 on beam, a 14.700 on floor, a 15.200 on vault, and a 15.300 on bars. Overall, she finished 10th on beam (28.250), 3rd on floor (29.150, tied with MyKayla Skinner), and 3rd on bars (30.500). She also placed 4th in the all around with a two-night total of 118.350, .200 behind Aly Raisman, who finished third.

Key was named to the Senior National Team for the first time and received an invitation to the 2015 Worlds Selection Camp in September. She was named as a non-traveling alternate to the 2015 World Championship team.

2016 
Key was scheduled to compete at the Secret U.S. Classic, but she later withdrew. Two weeks later, Key had decided to end her 2016 season due to an ongoing back injury, therefore ending her potential bid for the 2016 U.S. Women's Olympic Gymnastics team and her elite gymnastics career.

On September 30, 2016, Key announced that she had committed to the University of Alabama and the Alabama Crimson Tide gymnastics team, having previously been verbally committed to the University of Florida. She signed the National Letter of Intent to the University of Alabama and the Crimson Tide gymnastics team on November 10, 2016.

2017-2019 
Key joined the University of Alabama Crimson Tide gymnastics team for the 2018 season. She competed in the season opener at Michigan, where she fell off the balance beam, receiving a score of 8.475. This would ultimately be the only competitive routine of her college career.

In January 2019, it was announced that Key would miss the 2019 season due to an unspecified medical procedure.

In June 2019, Key announced her retirement from gymnastics.

Competitive history

References

External links 
Official website
http://www.usagym.org/pages/athletes/athleteListDetail.html?id=209895

1999 births
Living people
Alabama Crimson Tide women's gymnasts
American female artistic gymnasts
Junior artistic gymnasts
People from Augusta, Georgia
People from Montgomery, Texas
U.S. women's national team gymnasts
Gymnasts from Texas